Miss Polski 2015 was the 26th Miss Polski pageant, held on 6 December 2015. The winner was Magdalena Bieńkowska of Warmia-Masuria. Bieńkowska represented Poland in Miss International 2016, Miss World 2017 & Miss Supranational 2018. 1st Runner-Up Marta Redo represented the country at Miss Grand International 2016.

Final results

Special Awards

Judges
Ewa Mielnicka - Miss Polski 2014
Rafał Maślak - Mister Polski 2014
Krzysztof Gojdź - Doctor and Lecturer at the American Academy of Aesthetic Medicine
Viola Piekut - Designer
Tomasz Olejniczak - Designer of the TOMAOTOMO Brand
Małgorzata Tomaszewska - Presenter of Polsat TV
Mariusz Abramowicz - Journalist of Polsat News
Robert Czepiel - Owner of the Jubiler Schubert Brand
Aleksander Czepelewski - Marketing Director of Lactalis Polska
Gerhard Parzutka von Lipiński - President of Miss Polski
Lech Daniłowicz - Owner of the Miss Polski Competition
Ewa Wojciechowska - Journalist, Blogger, Glamour Woman of the Year 2012

Finalists

Notes

Withdrawals
 Lubusz

Did not compete
 Opole
 Subcarpathia
 Polish Community in Argentina
 Polish Community in Australia
 Polish Community in Belarus
 Polish Community in Brazil
 Polish Community in Canada
 Polish Community in France
 Polish Community in Germany
 Polish Community in Ireland
 Polish Community in Israel
 Polish Community in Lithuania
 Polish Community in Russia
 Polish Community in South Africa
 Polish Community in Sweden
 Polish Community in the U.K.
 Polish Community in the U.S.
 Polish Community in Venezuela

References

External links
Official Website

2015
2015 beauty pageants
2015 in Poland